The arrondissement of Alençon is an arrondissement of France in the Orne department in the Normandy region. It has 111 communes.

Composition

The communes of the arrondissement of Alençon, and their INSEE codes, are:

 Alençon (61001)
 Almenêches
 Aunay-les-Bois (61013)
 Aunou-sur-Orne (61015)
 Bagnoles de l'Orne Normandie (61483)
 Barville (61026)
 Beauvain (61035)
 Belfonds (61036)
 La Bellière
 Boissei-la-Lande
 Boitron (61051)
 Le Bouillon (61056)
 Brullemail (61064)
 Buré (61066)
 Bures (61067)
 Bursard (61068)
 Carrouges (61074)
 Ceaucé (61075)
 Le Cercueil (61076)
 Cerisé (61077)
 Chahains (61080)
 Chailloué (61081)
 Le Chalange (61082)
 Le Champ-de-la-Pierre (61085)
 La Chapelle-près-Sées (61098)
 Le Château-d'Almenêches
 La Chaux (61104)
 Ciral (61107)
 Colombiers (61111)
 Condé-sur-Sarthe (61117)
 Coulonges-sur-Sarthe (61126)
 Courtomer (61133)
 Cuissai (61141)
 Damigny (61143)
 Essay (61156)
 Écouves (61341)
 La Ferrière-Béchet (61164)
 La Ferrière-Bochard (61165)
 Ferrières-la-Verrerie (61166)
 Francheville
 Gandelain (61182)
 Gâprée (61183)
 Hauterive (61202)
 Héloup (61203)
 Joué-du-Bois (61209)
 Juvigny-Val-d'Andaine (61211)
 Lalacelle (61213)
 Laleu (61215)
 La Lande-de-Goult (61216)
 Larré (61224)
 Lonrai (61234)
 Macé (61240)
 Magny-le-Désert (61243)
 Mantilly (61248)
 Marchemaisons (61251)
 Médavy
 Méhoudin (61257)
 Le Mêle-sur-Sarthe (61258)
 Le Ménil-Broût (61261)
 Ménil-Erreux (61263)
 Le Ménil-Guyon (61266)
 Le Ménil-Scelleur (61271)
 Mieuxcé (61279)
 Montchevrel (61284)
 Montmerrei
 Mortrée
 La Motte-Fouquet (61295)
 Neauphe-sous-Essai (61301)
 Neuilly-le-Bisson (61304)
 L'Orée-d'Écouves (61228)
 Pacé (61321)
 Passais-Villages (61324)
 Perrou (61326)
 Le Plantis (61331)
 Rives-d'Andaine (61096)
 La Roche-Mabile (61350)
 Rouperroux (61357)
 Saint-Agnan-sur-Sarthe (61360)
 Saint-Aubin-d'Appenai (61365)
 Saint-Céneri-le-Gérei (61372)
 Saint-Denis-sur-Sarthon (61382)
 Saint-Ellier-les-Bois (61384)
 Sainte-Marguerite-de-Carrouges (61419)
 Sainte-Marie-la-Robert (61420)
 Sainte-Scolasse-sur-Sarthe (61454)
 Saint-Fraimbault (61387)
 Saint-Germain-du-Corbéis (61397)
 Saint-Germain-le-Vieux (61398)
 Saint-Gervais-du-Perron (61400)
 Saint-Julien-sur-Sarthe (61412)
 Saint-Léger-sur-Sarthe (61415)
 Saint-Léonard-des-Parcs (61416)
 Saint-Mars-d'Égrenne (61421)
 Saint-Martin-des-Landes (61424)
 Saint-Martin-l'Aiguillon (61427)
 Saint-Nicolas-des-Bois (61433)
 Saint-Ouen-le-Brisoult (61439)
 Saint-Patrice-du-Désert (61442)
 Saint-Quentin-de-Blavou (61450)
 Saint-Roch-sur-Égrenne (61452)
 Saint-Sauveur-de-Carrouges (61453)
 Sées (61464)
 Semallé (61467)
 Tanville (61480)
 Tellières-le-Plessis (61481)
 Tessé-Froulay (61482)
 Torchamp (61487)
 Trémont (61492)
 Valframbert (61497)
 Les Ventes-de-Bourse (61499)
 Vidai (61502)

History

The arrondissement of Alençon was created in 1800. At the January 2017 reorganisation of the arrondissements of Orne, it gained nine communes from the arrondissement of Argentan and five communes from the arrondissement of Mortagne-au-Perche, and it lost 11 communes to the arrondissement of Argentan and one commune to the arrondissement of Mortagne-au-Perche.

As a result of the reorganisation of the cantons of France which came into effect in 2015, the borders of the cantons are no longer related to the borders of the arrondissements. The cantons of the arrondissement of Alençon were, as of January 2015:

 Alençon-1
 Alençon-2
 Alençon-3
 Carrouges
 Courtomer
 Domfront
 La Ferté-Macé
 Juvigny-sous-Andaine
 Le Mêle-sur-Sarthe
 Passais
 Sées

References

Alencon